Ali Sadeq Benwan (Arabic:علي صادق بنوان) (born 30 November 1991) is an Iraqi footballer. He currently plays as a winger.

External links

References

Iraqi footballers
1991 births
Living people
Expatriate footballers in Qatar
Iraqi emigrants to Qatar
Iraqi expatriate footballers
Muaither SC players
Al Ahli SC (Doha) players
Al Kharaitiyat SC players
Al-Shamal SC players
Qatar Stars League players
Qatari Second Division players
Place of birth missing (living people)
Association football defenders
Association football midfielders